The Finalist was an American post-hardcore band from Houston, Texas.  The Finalist was founded in 2004 by frontman Dylan Brady and guitarist Jerry Nettles after they left their old band, unsatisfied with its sound.  Jerry's brother Brent joined on as bassist, and then Doug Adams joined as drummer.  The band recently signed to Maverick Records and Warner Bros. Records. The Finalist has completed the recording of a full-length release and is awaiting approval from the label.

The Finalist is most well known for their single "Leave The Broken Hearts Behind" which featured on the 2006 film, The Hills Have Eyes. Other songs include "Here With Me", "Fire", "Rain", "What Makes You Think", "You Crush Me", and "Will You Return".

The Band has been recently been dropped from Maverick Records, but are reportedly said to be signing to Tooth And Nail Records.

Doug Adams is no longer in the band. Currently on drums they have Jordan Brady, frontman Dylan Brady's younger brother. They have continued to tour, and play various shows in different locations.

In 2018 the band released an album with 14 tracks, 9 re-recorded and 5 new tracks

Discography
The Finalist EP - 2006
The Finalist EPII - 2006
The Hills Have Eyes, 2006The Finalist - 2018

External links
The Finalist on MySpace
Soundcrank podcast hosted by The Finalist

American post-hardcore musical groups
Musical groups established in 2004
Musical groups from Houston